Noémi Girardet (born 12 December 1994) is a Swiss freestyle swimmer. She competed in the women's 4 × 100 metre freestyle relay event at the 2016 Summer Olympics.

References

External links
 

1994 births
Living people
Olympic swimmers of Switzerland
Swimmers at the 2016 Summer Olympics
Place of birth missing (living people)
Swiss female freestyle swimmers
Sportspeople from the canton of Geneva
21st-century Swiss women